The Band Master is a 1917 American silent comedy film featuring Oliver Hardy.

Cast
 Billy West as Billy, bandleader
 Oliver Hardy (credited as Babe Hardy)

Reception
Like many American films of the time, The Band Master was subject to cuts by city and state film censorship boards. For example, the Chicago Board of Censors cut, in Reel 1, scene of dough dropping from West after he sits in the pan, Reel 2, two scenes of West kicking woman, two scenes of West dropping trousers, two scenes of West bumping woman, and West expectorating into telephone receptical (with figure of woman).

See also
 List of American films of 1917
 Oliver Hardy filmography

References

External links

1917 films
1917 short films
American silent short films
American black-and-white films
1917 comedy films
Films directed by Arvid E. Gillstrom
Silent American comedy films
American comedy short films
1910s American films